The values below are standard apparent reduction potentials  for electro-biochemical half-reactions measured at 25 °C, 1 atmosphere and a pH of 7 in aqueous solution.

The actual physiological potential depends on the ratio of the reduced and oxidized forms according to the Nernst equation and the thermal voltage.

When an oxidizer accepts a number z of electrons to be  converted in its reduced form, the half-reaction is expressed as:

  + z  → 

The reaction quotient (r) is the ratio of the chemical activity (ai) of the reduced form (the reductant, aRed) to the activity of the oxidized form (the oxidant, aox). It is equal to the ratio of their concentrations (Ci) only if the system is sufficiently diluted and the activity coefficients (γi) are close to unity (ai = γi Ci):

 

At chemical equilibrium, the reaction quotient  of the product activity (aRed) by the reagent activity (aOx) is equal to the equilibrium constant of the half-reaction and in the absence of driving force the potential also becomes nul.

The numerically simplified form of the Nernst equation is expressed as:

Where  is the standard reduction potential of the half-reaction expressed versus the standard reduction potential of hydrogen. For standard conditions in electrochemistry (T = 25 °C, P = 1 atm and all concentrations being fixed at 1 mol/L, or 1 M) the standard reduction potential of hydrogen  is fixed at zero by convention as it serves of reference. The standard hydrogen electrode (SHE), with [] = 1 M works thus at a pH = 0.

At pH = 7, when [] = 10−7 M, the reduction potential  of  differs from zero because it depends on pH.

Solving the Nernst equation for the half-reaction of reduction of two protons into hydrogen gas gives:

 

 

In biochemistry and in biological fluids, at pH = 7, it is thus important to note that the reduction potential of the protons into hydrogen gas  is no longer zero as with the standard hydrogen electrode (SHE) at 1 M  (pH = 0) in classical electrochemistry, but that  versus the standard hydrogen electrode (SHE).

The same also applies for the reduction potential of oxygen:

For ,  = 1.229 V, so, applying the Nernst equation for pH = 7 gives:

 

 

For obtaining the values of the reduction potential at pH = 7 for the redox reactions relevant for biological systems, the same kind of conversion exercise is done using the corresponding Nernst equation expressed as a function of pH.

The conversion is simple, but care must be taken not to inadvertently mix reduction potential converted at pH = 7 with other data directly taken from tables referring to SHE (pH = 0).

Expression of the Nernst equation as a function of pH

The  and pH of a solution are related by the Nernst equation as commonly represented by a Pourbaix diagram . For a half cell equation, conventionally written as a reduction reaction (i.e., electrons accepted by an oxidant on the left side):

 

The half-cell standard reduction potential  is given by

 

The Nernst equation relates pH and :

   

This equation predicts lower  at higher pH values.  This is observed for the reduction of O2 into H2O, or OH−, and for reduction of H+ into H2.

Formal standard reduction potential combined with the pH dependency
To obtain the reduction potential as a function of the measured concentrations of the redox-active species in solution, it is necessary to express the activities as a function of the concentrations.

 

Given that the chemical activity denoted here by { } is the product of the activity coefficient γ by the concentration denoted by [ ]: ai = γi·Ci, here expressed as {X} = γx [X] and {X}x = (γx)x [X]x and  replacing the logarithm of a product by the sum of the logarithms (i.e., log (a·b) = log a + log b), the log of the reaction quotient (without {H+} already isolated apart in the last term as h pH) expressed here above with activities { } becomes:

 

It allows to reorganize the Nernst equation as:

 

 

Where  is the formal standard potential independent of pH including the activity coefficients.

Combining  directly with the last term depending on pH gives:

 

For a pH = 7:

 

So,

 

It is therefore important to know to what exact definition does refer the value of a reduction potential for a given biochemical redox process reported at pH = 7, and to correctly understand the relationship used.

Is it simply: 
  calculated at pH 7 (with or without corrections for the activity coefficients), 
 , a formal standard reduction potential including the activity coefficients but no pH calculations, or, is it, 
 , an apparent formal standard reduction potential at pH 7 in given conditions and also depending on the ratio .
This requires thus to dispose of a clear definition of the considered reduction potential, and of a sufficiently detailed description of the conditions in which it is valid, along with a complete expression of the corresponding Nernst equation. Were also the reported values only derived from thermodynamic calculations, or determined from experimental measurements and under what specific conditions? Without being able to correctly answering these questions, mixing data from different sources without appropriate conversion can lead to errors and confusion.

Determination of the formal standard reduction potential when   1

The formal standard reduction potential  can be defined as the measured reduction potential  of the half-reaction at unity concentration ratio of the oxidized and reduced species (i.e., when   1) under given conditions.

Indeed:

as, when ,

 , when ,

The formal reduction potential makes possible to more simply work with molar or molal concentrations in place of activities. Because molar and molal concentrations were once referred as formal concentrations, it could explain the origin of the adjective formal in the expression formal potential.

The formal potential is thus the reversible potential of an electrode at equilibrium immersed in a solution where reactants and products are at unit concentration. If any small incremental change of potential causes a change in the direction of the reaction, i.e. from reduction to oxidation or vice versa, the system is close to equilibrium, reversible and is at its formal potential. When the formal potential is measured under standard conditions (i.e. the activity of each dissolved species is 1 mol/L, T = 298.15 K = 25 °C = 77 °F,  = 1 bar) it becomes de facto a standard potential. According to Brown and Swift (1949), "A formal potential is defined as the potential of a half-cell, measured against the standard hydrogen electrode, when the total concentration of each oxidation state is one formal".

Formal reduction potentials are applied to simplify results interpretations and calculations of a considered system. Their relationship with the standard reduction potentials must be clearly expressed to avoid any confusion.

Main factors affecting the formal (or apparent) standard reduction potentials

The main factor affecting the formal (or apparent) reduction potentials  in biochemical or biological processes is the pH. To determine approximate values of formal reduction potentials, neglecting in a first approach changes in activity coefficients due to ionic strength, the Nernst equation has to be applied taking care to first express the relationship as a function of pH. The second factor to be considered are the values of the concentrations taken into account in the Nernst equation. To define a formal reduction potential for a biochemical reaction, the pH value, the concentrations values and the hypotheses made on the activity coefficients must always be clearly indicated. When using, or comparing, several formal (or apparent) reduction potentials they must also be internally consistent.

Problems may occur when mixing different sources of data using different conventions or approximations (i.e., with different underlying hypotheses). When working at the frontier between inorganic and biological processes (e.g., when comparing abiotic and biotic processes in geochemistry when microbial activity could also be at work in the system), care must be taken not to inadvertently directly mix standard reduction potentials ( versus SHE, pH = 0) with formal (or apparent) reduction potentials ( at pH = 7). Definitions must be clearly expressed and carefully controlled, especially if the sources of data are different and arise from different fields (e.g., picking and directly mixing data from classical electrochemistry textbooks ( versus SHE, pH = 0) and microbiology textbooks ( at pH = 7) without paying attention to the conventions on which they are based).

Example in biochemistry
For example, in a two electrons couple like : the reduction potential becomes ~ 30 mV (or more exactly, 59.16 mV/2 = 29.6 mV) more positive for every power of ten increase in the ratio of the oxidised to the reduced form.

Some important apparent potentials used in biochemistry

See also
 Nernst equation
 Electron bifurcation
 Pourbaix diagram
 Reduction potential
 Dependency of reduction potential on pH
 Standard electrode potential
 Standard reduction potential
 Standard reduction potential (data page)
 Standard state

References

Bibliography
Electrochemistry
 

Bio-electrochemistry
 
 
 
 
 
 

Microbiology
 
 

Biochemistry
Standard reduction potentials for half-reactions important in biochemistry
Electrochemical potentials
Thermodynamics databases
Biochemistry databases